SATURN (Simulation and Assignment of Traffic to Urban Road Networks)  is a computer program that calculates transport assignment on road networks. It is developed by the University of Leeds and Atkins.

Saturn competes with VISUM by PTV.

References

Traffic simulation